The 2000 Huntingdonshire District Council election took place on 4 May 2000 to elect members of Huntingdonshire District Council in Cambridgeshire, England. One third of the council was up for election and the Conservative Party stayed in overall control of the council.

After the election, the composition of the council was:
Conservative 37
Liberal Democrats 13
Independent 3

Election result

Ward results

By-elections between 2000 and 2002

Upwood and the Raveleys

Eynesbury

Farcet

Gransden

Eaton Socon

References

2000 English local elections
2000
2000s in Cambridgeshire